Francesco Forte (born 13 November 1998) is an Italian football player. He plays for ACR Messina.

Club career
He made his Serie C debut for Casertana on 7 November 2017 in a game against Lecce.

On 9 July 2019 he joined ACR Messina in Serie D. He left the club in December 2019 to rejoin fellow league club Fidelis Andria.

References

External links
 

1998 births
Living people
People from Pozzuoli
Footballers from Campania
Italian footballers
Association football defenders
Delfino Pescara 1936 players
Casertana F.C. players
S.S. Fidelis Andria 1928 players
A.C.R. Messina players
Serie C players
Serie D players